Coolidge Corner Theatre is a nonprofit, independent cinema and community cultural center in the Coolidge Corner section of Brookline, Massachusetts specializing in international, documentary, animated, and independent film selections, series, classes, and seminars.

History
Coolidge Corner Theatre was built as a Universalist church in 1906 and was redesigned as an Art Deco movie palace in 1933 as the community's first movie theatre. The theatre opened on December 30, 1933 with its first film being a Disney short film. Originally the theatre only had one screen but was later divided into two and then four.

In the 1980s, owner and operator Justin Freed thought that he could no longer compete with rising video sales and competition from other art houses. In 1986, the theatre was sold to a developer due to financial trouble and planned to be torn down or converted to commercial business. Harold Brown, a Boston real estate magnate living in Brookline, bought the whole building and leased the theatre to the Coolidge Corner Theatre Foundation in November 1989 for 99 years.

Comedian and Brookline, Massachusetts native John Hodgman worked at the Coolidge Corner Theatre in his youth.

Julianne Moore once saw Eraserhead at the Coolidge Corner Theatre.

Coolidge Award
The Coolidge Award annually recognizes a film artist who “advances the spirit of original and challenging cinema.’’ 
Recipients of this venue's annual Coolidge Award include:

2005: Vittorio Storaro 
2006: Meryl Streep 
2010: Jonathan Demme 
2012: Viggo Mortensen 
2013: Thelma Schoonmaker 
2016: Jane Fonda 
2017: Werner Herzog 
2018: Michael Douglas 
2019: Julianne Moore

Images

References

Theatres in Massachusetts
Buildings and structures in Brookline, Massachusetts
Movie palaces
Tourist attractions in Brookline, Massachusetts